ASMM may refer to:

 African States, Madagascar and Mauritius; see Yaoundé Convention
 American School of Modern Music, a music school in Paris, France